Tincinae is a subfamily of freshwater ray-finned fish from the family Cyprinidae, it consists of the tench of Eurasia and the east Asian clod minnows.

Tinca tinca is a freshwater tincinae fish that is found in the Danube basin

Genera
There are two genera which are classified within the Tincinae, according to the 5th edition of the Fishes of the World, although in other classifications the subfamily is treated as either synonymous with other subfamilies within Cyprinidae or as a family in its own right. These also give differing statuses to Tanichthys.

Tanichthys S. Y. Lin, 1932 (Mountain or Cardinal minnows)
Tinca, Garsault 1764 (Tench)

References

Cyprinidae
Fish subfamilies
Taxa named by David Starr Jordan